Rubén Lobato Elvira (born September 1, 1978 in San Sebastián de los Reyes, Madrid) is a Spanish former professional road bicycle racer who competed for  (2002), Domina Vacanze-Elitron (2003) and Saunier Duval (2004–2008). On July 16, 2010, the UCI suspended him for 2 years, effective immediately, for irregularities in his BIO-passport, making him eligible for return July 16, 2012.

Major results

2001
 2nd Overall Circuito Montañés
 8th Coppa Placci
2002
 7th GP du canton d'Argovie
 7th Subida al Naranco
2003
 1st Memorial Manuel Galera
 6th Subida al Naranco
 7th Trofeo Melinda
2004
 5th GP Lugano
2005
 1st  Mountains classification, Tour de Romandie
 2nd Circuito de Getxo
 8th GP Villafranca de Ordizia

Grand Tour general classification results timeline

References

External links

Profile on official Saunier Duval-Prodir website

1978 births
Living people
Spanish male cyclists
Doping cases in cycling
Spanish sportspeople in doping cases
Cyclists from the Community of Madrid
People from San Sebastián de los Reyes